Jim Roche may refer to:

 Jim Roche (artist), American artist, flourishing since the 1970s
 Jim Roche (hurler) (1909-1980), Irish hurler
 Jimmy Joe Roche, American visual artist and underground filmmaker, flourishing since the 1990s

See also
 James Roche (disambiguation)